Devin Gibson (born May 21, 1989) is an American professional basketball player who currently plays for Kangoeroes Basket Willebroek of the Basketball League Belgium (BLB). As a freshman in 2007–08, he led the NCAA Division I in steals per game. Gibson signed a contract with the San Antonio Spurs in 2011 but never made an official appearance in the NBA. He played college basketball with UTSA, and was designated to four conference first, second, or third teams. At the professional level, Gibson has been with Fraport Skyliners and BC Kalev/Cramo.

See also 
List of NCAA Division I men's basketball season steals leaders

References 

1989 births
Living people
American expatriate basketball people in Belgium
American expatriate basketball people in Estonia
American expatriate basketball people in Germany
American men's basketball players
Basketball players from Houston
BC Kalev/Cramo players
Guards (basketball)
Kangoeroes Basket Mechelen players
Skyliners Frankfurt players
UTSA Roadrunners men's basketball players